Indatraline hydrochloride (Lu 19-005) is an antidepressive agent and non-selective monoamine transporter inhibitor that blocks the reuptake of dopamine, norepinephrine, and serotonin, with similar efficacy to cocaine. However, it's effects have a slower onset and a longer duration than those from cocaine. Because of this, the compound may be used to treat cocaine addictions. Lu 19-005 has been shown to block the action of methamphetamine and MDMA in laboratory experiments.

Methylation
If indatraline is N-alkylated at the amino group, it is possible to slow the onset of action so that it is not until N-demethylation occurs that the molecules become active. N-methylindatraline has a much longer duration than indatraline because norindatraline is inactive, whereas demethylating N-methylindatraline does not terminate the actions of the parent compound. Effects of N-dimethylindatraline start about 20–30 minutes after administration, making it less likely to be abused than cocaine.

Synthesis
Two main routes have been reported. The first route shown is the original one reported by Bøgesø and co-workers.

The other had been adapted to scale-up:

Another method involves the contraction of a dihydronaphthalene (6–6 fused system) to form the 6–5 indane skeleton.

Routes based on 1-indanone types of intermediates are not as simple as a direct reduction of an imine or oxime. The undesirable cis diastereomers are formed instead of the desirable trans isomers. This adds an extra step to the synthetic route. First, the ketones are reduced to get mostly cis alcohols. Second, the cis alcohols are converted to the corresponding mesylates conserving stereochemistry.  Third, the mesylates can then be reacted with e.g. N-methylbenzylamine, affecting a Walden inversion (SN2). Finally, the removal of the benzyl affords the product as a racemic mixture.

See also 
 Sertraline
 Tametraline
 Ibogamine

References 

Substance dependence
1-Aminoindanes
Chloroarenes
Serotonin–norepinephrine–dopamine reuptake inhibitors
Stimulants